Wayne Township is one of eight townships in Bollinger County, Missouri, USA. As of the 2000 U.S. Census, its population was 1,415. As of the 2010 U.S. Census, the population had decreased to 1,299.

Demographics
As of the 2010 U.S. Census, there were 1,299 people living in the township. There were 740 housing units in the township. The racial makeup of the township was 99.31% White, 0.15% Asian, and 0.54% from two or more races. Approximately 0.69% of the population were Hispanic or Latino of any race.

Geography

Incorporated Areas
The township contains one incorporated settlement: Zalma.

Unincorporated Areas
The township contains the unincorporated areas and historical communities of Arab, April Hills, Gipsy, Greenbrier, and Sturdivant.

Cemeteries
The township contains the nine following cemeteries: Cato, Clubb, Cox, Eakers, Maddox, Mount Pleasant, Speer, Sturdivant, and White.

Streams
The streams of Bear Creek, Brush Creek, Cypress Slough, Jesse Creek, Lick Log Creek, Mitz Branch, Perkins Creek, Pond Creek, Slagle Creek, and Talley Branch flow through Wayne Township. Other bodies of water located in the township include the Castor River, Cypress Pond, the Headwater Diversion Channel, and Wonder (Sherman's) Lake.

Landmarks
Castor River Conservation Area 
Dark Cypress Swamp State Wildlife Area 
Duck Creek Conservation Area
Gipsy Tower Site 
Maple Flats Access
Mill Dam 
Sweetgum Access

Administrative Districts

School Districts
Zalma R-V School District

Political Districts
Missouri's 8th Congressional District
State House District 145 
State Senate District 27

References

 USGS Geographic Names Information System (GNIS)

External links
 US-Counties.com
 City-Data.com

Townships in Bollinger County, Missouri
Cape Girardeau–Jackson metropolitan area
Townships in Missouri